Joel Hoffman may refer to:
Joel Hoffman (composer) (born 1953), Canadian classical music composer and pianist
Joel Hoffman (tennis) (born 1958), American tennis player
Joel Manuel Hoffman (born 1968), American scholar, writer, speaker, and novelist